Jeanne Jolly is a singer-songwriter from Raleigh, North Carolina, who first gained fame as a featured vocalist for Grammy Award winning jazz trumpeter Chris Botti. Jolly has performed with several symphonies, at Carnegie Hall in New York City, and at the Monterey Jazz Festival in California.

Jolly attended Saint Mary's School in Raleigh and then Western Carolina University. She graduated with a master's degree in classical voice from the New England Conservatory of Music.

Jolly was featured on the June 29, 2012, episode of WUNC's The State of Things with Frank Stasio discussing her upcoming album and her mother's death to cancer. On October 2, 2012, Jolly released her first full-length album, Angels, on Foreign Exchange Music. It was produced entirely by The Foreign Exchange collaborator Chris Boerner.

On October 11, 2014 Jeanne married Todd McLean in a ceremony at Emerald Isle, North Carolina.

Discography
Studio albums
 2012: Angels
 2015: A Place To Run

EPs
 2010: Falling in Carolina

Singles
 2010: Here With You
 2011: Laughing at Your Plans (with The Foreign Exchange)
 2012: Hallelujah
 2012: Sweet Love
 2013: The Hard Way
 2013: Good Man

References

External links
 

Living people
American women singer-songwriters
Musicians from Raleigh, North Carolina
Year of birth missing (living people)
St. Mary's School (North Carolina) alumni
Singer-songwriters from North Carolina